"Memphis" is a song by English singer-songwriter and musician Joe Jackson, which was released in 1983 as a single from the soundtrack album of the American film Mike's Murder. The song was written by Jackson, and produced by Jackson and David Kershenbaum. "Memphis" reached No. 85 on the US Billboard Hot 100.

Critical reception
On its release, Cash Box wrote, "Jackson gives a rockabilly-voiced recounting of a disastrously funny journey to the city of his cultural roots." They considered the organ intro to be similar to that of the 1966 Spencer Davis Group song "Gimme Some Lovin'" and the bass line to be the same as Jackson's 1982 hit "Steppin' Out". In a review of Mike's Murder, Brett Milano of The Boston Globe felt the song "recalls the punkish sound of Jackson's early albums" and also drew similarities between the song's organ riff and "Gimme Some Lovin'".

John Laycock of the Windsor Star stated that the song "consciously steals several musical references, especially the famous organ riff straight out of 'Gimme Some Lovin'.'" Gary Graff of the Detroit Free Press identified further musical similarities and stated that Jackson uses "Memphis" as a "tossing ground for licks" from the Spencer Davis Group's "I'm a Man", the Ventures' "Wipe Out" and the Steve Miller Band's "Living in the U.S.A." Jim Zebora of the Record-Journal noted the similarity to "Steppin' Out", writing, "If you can tell this song from 'Steppin' Out' with your eyes closed, you can probably do the same with identical twins."

Track listing
7-inch single
"Memphis" - 4:44
"Laundromat Monday" - 3:31

7-inch single (US/Canada release)
"Memphis" - 4:44
"Breakdown" - 3:59

7-inch single (US promo)
"Memphis" - 4:44
"Memphis" - 4:44

12-inch single (Spanish release)
"Memphis" - 4:44
"Laundromat Monday" - 3:31
"Moonlight Theme" - 3:25

Personnel
Production
 Joe Jackson – producer and arranger (all tracks)
 David Kershenbaum – producer of "Memphis"
 Brad Leigh – engineer
 Larry Franke – assistant engineer
 Phil Jamtaas – remix engineer
 David Bianco – assistant remix engineer

Charts

References

1983 songs
1983 singles
Joe Jackson (musician) songs
Songs written by Joe Jackson (musician)
A&M Records singles